Tylopilus montanus is a bolete fungus in the family Boletaceae. It is found in Costa Rica, where it grows on the ground in tropical montane forest under Quercus and Magnolia.

References

External links

montanus
Fungi described in 1989
Fungi of Central America